Alien Worlds was a science fiction anthology comic book published in the early 1980s.

Alien Worlds may also refer to:

 "Alien Worlds (radio)", a popular syndicated radio show that first aired in 1979
 Alien Worlds (Aurelia and Blue Moon), the UK broadcast name of the extra-solar planetary documentary "Extraterrestrial"
 Alien Worlds (TV series), a 2020 documentary series on Netflix